Duivendrecht station (Dvd) is a combined rail and metro station in Duivendrecht, Netherlands. The station opened on 23 May 1993 as part of the extension of the Zuidtak of the Amsterdam Ringspoorbaan, between Amsterdam RAI and Weesp.
This station allows for the interchange between two grade-separated railways:
the Amsterdam–Arnhem railway on the upper floor, consisting of two island platforms with the outer sides serving heavy rail and the inner sides serving the Amsterdam Metro, which runs in between the tracks of the main railway.
the Weesp–Leiden railway on the lower floor, consisting of one broad island platform which also houses the station hall.

Duivendrecht is largely an interchange station: the village itself is quite small. However, the Duivendrecht railway station is near the Amsterdam ArenA and the Amsterdam Bijlmer ArenA railway station. Since December 2006, fewer trains call at Duivendrecht because passenger trains heading from Utrecht towards Schiphol v.v. nowadays use the Utrechtboog.

Services

Train
, the following train services call at this station:
Lower floor
2× per hour Intercity service Lelystad - Almere - Duivendrecht - Amsterdam Zuid - Schiphol Airport - Leiden - The hague - Delft - Rotterdam - Dordrecht
2× per hour Intercity service Schiphol - Amsterdam Zuid - Duivendrecht - Hilversum - Amersfoort Schothorst
2× per hour local Sprinter service Hoofddorp - Schiphol Airport - Duivendrecht - Weesp - Almere Oostvaarders
2× per hour local Sprinter service Hoofddorp - Schiphol Airport - Duivendrecht - Weesp - Hilversum - Utrecht
Upper floor
2× per hour local Sprinter service Uitgeest - Amsterdam - Breukelen - Woerden - Rotterdam
2× per hour local Sprinter service Uitgeest - Amsterdam - Breukelen - Utrecht - Rhenen

Metro
M50: Gein - Holendrecht - Amsterdam bijlmer ArenA - Duivendrecht - Amsterdam Rai - Amsterdam Zuid - Amsterdam Lelylaan - Amsterdam Sloterdijk - Isolatorweg
M54: Gein - Holendrecht - Amsterdam bijlmer ArenA - Duivendrecht - Amsterdam Amstel - Amsterdam Central station

Bus

External links

NS website
Dutch Public Transport journey planner

Railway stations in North Holland
Railway stations opened in 1993
Railway stations on the Rhijnspoorweg
Railway stations on the Zuidtak Ringspoorbaan
Amsterdam Metro stations
Ouder-Amstel